Whitmore is an unincorporated community in Sandusky County, in the U.S. state of Ohio.

History
A post office called Whitmore was established in 1881, and remained in operation until 1905. Besides the post office, Whitmore had a railroad station.

References

Unincorporated communities in Sandusky County, Ohio
Unincorporated communities in Ohio